Armand Havet (1795, Rouen – 1820) was a French botanist.

References

1795 births
1820 deaths
Scientists from Rouen
19th-century French botanists